, nicknamed Makocchan (まこっちゃん), is a former member of the Japanese idol group Passpo. Her official color was pink.

Career
Okunaka released a photobook "Run Run Makoto" in 2011. She starred as the female lead Koyomi in Kamen Rider Wizard, which aired from 2012 to 2013. Her second photobook "Kawaikute Makoto ni Suimasen!" was released April 15, 2013. Lastly in "Good bye my life", her third photobook, she tries show us a mature side of herself. It was shot in Bali and released on Valentine's Day 2014.

On September 28, 2014, at Shinjuku BLAZE, Makochan announced graduation from the group, meaning she would leave PASSPO. Her last "flight" (show) took place at Tokyo Dome City Hall, on January 1, 2015.

She would later appear in Kamen Rider Ghost as Honami, the leader of a fictional idol group called Harp+y 4.

Filmography

Television

Film

References

External links
 Official Blog 

21st-century Japanese actresses
Japanese idols
1993 births
Living people
Musicians from Saitama Prefecture